is a Japanese voice actor from Tokyo.

Notable Roles

Video Game Roles
Dynasty Warriors and Warriors Orochi series as Meng Huo, Zhang He
Der Langrisser as Morgan
Voltage Fighter Gowcaizer as Marion, Ball Boy

Drama CD Roles
Emerald Dragon as Nakai Kazuya

Anime Roles
Angelic Layer as Shuji Inada; Host
Code Geass: Lelouch of the Rebellion as Gilbert G.P. Guilford
Code Geass: Lelouch of the Rebellion R2 as Gilbert G.P. Guilford
Dragon Ball Z as Yakon
Gegege no Kitarō (1996)
Gregory Horror Show as Cactus Gunman; Judgement Boy (2nd Voice)
Jigoku Sensei Nube as Ishikawa-sensei
Kuso Kagaku Sekai Gulliver Boy as Man (ep 1); Resistance man (eps 13,14,48)
Marmalade Boy as Bob; Sakurai
Otogi Zoshi as Customer (ep 25)
Sailor Moon as Soldier (ep 44)
Sailor Moon Sailor Stars as Choreographer (ep 176); College Student (ep 191); DJ (ep 195); Mysterious Person (ep 183); Staff (ep 175)
Sailor Moon SuperS as Candy Vender (ep 146); Editor 1 (ep 134)
Yu-Gi-Oh! as Chairman (ep 12); Radio announcer (ep 2); Teacher (ep 7); Watchmaker's shop salesperson (ep 4)
Zone of the Enders as Worker (Ep. 2)

Tokusatsu Roles
Mirai Sentai Timeranger as Hacker Yuugento (ep 35)
Tokumei Sentai Go-Busters as Domeloid (ep 38)

OVA Roles
Kishin Corps as Messenger (ep 7)
Legend of Crystania as Fang of the Animals
Voltage Fighter Gowcaizer as Ball Boy, Saburo Jumonji/Brider 2

Movie Roles
Sailor Moon S Movie: Hearts in Ice as Press
Slam Dunk movie 3 as Yoshi Ebina

External links
 
 Yoshiyuki Kouno at Aoni Production

Living people
Japanese male voice actors
Year of birth missing (living people)